Juaymah Maureen Transport (JMT) is a bus company owned and operated by a Filipino family from Las Piñas. It plies routes from Alabang in Muntinlupa to Lawton and Quiapo in Manila and sometimes to Ayala in Makati.

Etymology

The name Juaymah was said to be taken from Leah Juaymah Mababangloob. The name Maureen, on the other hand, was believed to be taken from Maureen Mababangloob. These were the daughters of Oscar and Elenita Mababangloob, the founders of Juaymah Maureen Transport.

History

Juaymah Maureen Transport was established in 1994 by Oscar Mababangloob, a resident of Las Piñas.

As of today, Juaymah Maureen Transport is utilizing Hino units with roughly a total of estimated 30 buses. Recently, it was taken over by HM Transport Inc/South City Express Inc. and currently utilizes Higer buses.

Recent Incidents 

In a news article from Abante-Tonite last 2005, twenty-two passengers boarding Juaymah Maureen Transport with an unknown bus unit experienced trauma and fear as they were held up by 5 armed men in almost an hour. Five armed men got on the bus at GMA, Cavite on 7:00 A.M. and upon reaching Carmona Exit toll, they declared hold-up, and all valuables of the 22 passengers were taken. The armed men got off the bus at Arnaiz Avenue, South Luzon Expressway, Makati.

Issues and Criticisms

Juaymah Maureen Transport is the only bus company with air-conditioned units plying routes from Gen. Mariano Alvarez and Carmona, Cavite to Lawton, Quiapo and Ayala. The issue of separation from other bus companies was that JMT has no original franchise from the Land Transportation Franchising and Regulatory Board (LTFRB) so that the motor pools are located at Almanza, Las Piñas and Gen. Mariano Alvarez, Cavite.

Juaymah Maureen Transport has brought up a bad image to many commuters, especially students. One such issue is the illegal increase of the fare upon orders of the bus company management. Based on the blog made by a nursing student, JMT was not included in the present fare hike, thereby charging a higher fare than that of a required fare approved by the LTFRB. It was surprising that the fare matrix the conductor had shown to him was actually a fake one. Until now, most of the conductors are still following rules from the management, though they were actually prohibited by the LTFRB and the Land Transportation Office (LTO) to charge illegal fares and to ply on designated routes.

Bus Terminals 

 Metro Manila
 Quiapo, Manila
 Plaza Lawton (Park n' Ride), Manila
 Alabang, Muntinlupa
 Ayala, Makati
 Coastal Mall, Parañaque
 SM Southmall, Las Piñas*
 Provincial Destinations
 Carmona, Cavite
 Gen. Mariano Alvarez, Cavite

(*) denotes that is now operated by Jack DM Liner

References 

Bus companies of the Philippines
Companies based in Las Piñas
Companies based in Cavite